Androloma maccullochii, or Macculloch's forester, is an owlet moth (family Noctuidae). The species was first described by William Kirby in 1837. It is found in North America.

The MONA or Hodges number for Androloma maccullochii is 9321.

References

Further reading

External links
 

Agaristinae
Articles created by Qbugbot
Moths described in 1837